Cooloola is a coastal locality in the Gympie Region, Queensland, Australia.

Geography
Cooloola is a coastal locality, being bounded by Wide Bay in the Coral Sea to the east including the major headland, Double Island Point. From Double Island Point, Rainbow Beach extends to the west and then to the north, while Teewah Beach stretches for many kilometres to the south. Off the coast of Double Island Point is Wolf Rock which is Queensland's most important habitat area for the critically endangered grey nurse shark.  It is a mating area and a high number of females and pregnant females have been seen there.

The locality's north-west boundary is Tin Can Inlet off Tin Can Bay. The locality is entirely within the Great Sandy National Park and is undeveloped apart from some basic bushwalking and camping infrastructure.

History
The 2011 census recorded Cooloola's population as 0.

Heritage listings
Cooloola has a number of heritage-listed sites, including:
 Cooloola Tramway
 Double Island Point Light

Amenities 
Cooloola Wesleyan Methodist Church meets at the Veterans & Community Hall on the corner of Nautilus Drive and Santa Maria Court in Cooloola Cove. It is part of the Wesleyan Methodist Church of Australia.

Attractions
The Cooloola Great Walk is a 5-day walking track through Cooloola through to Rainbow Beach (to the north) and Noosa North Shore to the south.

See also
 List of tramways in Queensland

References

 
Gympie Region
Coastline of Queensland
Localities in Queensland